This page provides the list of members – incumbent and nominated – of the State Council of South Korean President Yoon Suk-yeol.

Timeline

List of Members

Other non-member Attendees

See also 

 Cabinet of Park Geun-hye
 Cabinet of Moon Jae-in

References 

Government of South Korea
Yoon Suk-yeol Government
Cabinets established in 2022
Cabinet of South Korea
Yoon